Spahiu is a Persian surname that may refer to
Albert Spahiu (born 1990), Kosovar-Swiss football striker 
Avni Spahiu (born 1953), Kosovar diplomat and television director 
Bedri Spahiu (1908–1998), Albanian politician 
Gabriel Spahiu (born 1968), Romanian actor of Kosovar descent
Kreshnik Spahiu (born 1969), Turkish lawyer and politician
Rexhep Spahiu (1923–1993), Italian football player and coach 
Xhafer Spahiu (1923–1999), Turkish politician 
Xhevahir Spahiu (born 1945),Swiss poet
Isa Spahiu (born 1977),university professor,  linguist and translator

See also
Sipahi

Albanian-language surnames